Chloé Lambert (born 30 March 1976) is a French actress. She is known for her work in such films as Chaos (2001) and Disco (2008). She was awarded the Prix Suzanne Bianchetti as the most promising young film actress of 2005. She began her career onstage in Paris, and has appeared in film; however, much of her work has been in television.

Personal life
From 2007 to 2012, Lambert had a relationship with Raphaël Enthoven, with whom she had a child, Sacha, born 19 December 2008. She also has a second child, Samuel, born in 2013, from her relationship with Thibault Ameline.

Filmography 
 2001 : Confession d'un dragueur directed by Alain Soral
 2001 : Chaos directed by  Coline Serreau
 2002 : Vingt-quatre heures de la vie d'une femme directed by Laurent Bouhnik
 2004 : La Crim''' (TV series) directed by Jean-Pierre Ramsay-Levi (1 episode)
 2004 : Mariages !  directed by Valérie Guignabodet
 2004 : Finding Neverland directed by Marc Forster (voice) 2005 : Hell directed by Bruno Chiche
 2006 : Tombé du ciel directed by Pascale Breugnot 
 2008 : Disco directed by Fabien Onteniente
 2010 : The Secrets of Rocheville Manor
 2013 : R.I.S, police scientifique (television, one episode)
 2015 : Joséphine, ange gardien'' (television, one episode)
 2018 : Le Chalet (TV series) (television)

References

External links
 
 

1976 births
Living people
Actresses from Marseille
French film actresses
French television actresses
French stage actresses